Dendryphantes neethlingi is a jumping spider species of the genus Dendryphantes that lives in South Africa.

References

Endemic fauna of South Africa
Salticidae
Spiders described in 2013
Spiders of South Africa
Taxa named by Wanda Wesołowska